Fun-Fare is a 2014 album by Japanese duo Every Little Thing.

Fun Fare may also refer to:
 Fun Fare (comic), a British children's comic published 1946
 FunFare, a 2009–2010 American children's magazine title of Wizard Entertainment
 Fun Fare; a Treasury of Reader's Digest Wit and Humor, first issued 1949

See also
 Fan Fare, an American syndicated cartoon strip by Walt Ditzen
 Funfair (disambiguation)